Ardfert was a constituency represented in the House of Commons of the Parliament of Ireland until the Act of Union 1800.

Area
This constituency was based in the town of Ardfert in County Kerry.

History
Ardfert in County Kerry was enfranchised as a borough constituency, by a charter in 1639 with a Provost, 12 Burgesses and freemen.  It had a Corporation, and the electorate consisted of 13 burgesses and 50 freemen. The parliamentary representatives of the borough were elected using the bloc vote for two-member elections and first past the post for single-member by-elections. In the Patriot Parliament of 1689 summoned by King James II, Ardfert was not represented.

It continued to be entitled to send two Members of Parliament to the Irish House of Commons until the Act of Union merged Parliament of Ireland into the Parliament of the United Kingdom on 1 January 1801. The constituency was disenfranchised on 31 December 1800.

Thereafter borough was represented in the House of Commons of the United Kingdom as part of the county constituency of Kerry.

Members of Parliament, 1634–1801

Notes

References

Bibliography

Johnston-Liik, E. M. (2002). History of the Irish Parliament, 1692–1800, Publisher: Ulster Historical Foundation (28 February 2002),
 T. W. Moody, F. X. Martin, F. J. Byrne, A New History of Ireland 1534-1691, Oxford University Press, 1978

Constituencies of the Parliament of Ireland (pre-1801)
Historic constituencies in County Kerry
1639 establishments in Ireland
Constituencies established in 1639
1800 disestablishments in Ireland
Constituencies disestablished in 1800